Mario Evaristo Leguizamón Martínez (born 7 July 1982 in Montevideo) is an Uruguayan football player who last played as an attacking midfielder for C.A. Progreso.

External links
 
 
 

1982 births
Living people
Uruguayan footballers
Association football midfielders
Club Deportivo Universidad de San Martín de Porres players
Peñarol players
Plaza Colonia players
C.S. Emelec footballers
José Gálvez FBC footballers
Montevideo Wanderers F.C. players
Deportivo Táchira F.C. players
Club Deportivo Universidad César Vallejo footballers
C.D. Olimpia players
Expatriate footballers in Ecuador
Expatriate footballers in Peru
Expatriate footballers in Venezuela
Expatriate footballers in Honduras
Footballers from Montevideo
Club Universitario de Deportes footballers
Club Atlético River Plate (Montevideo) players